Ericameria laricifolia is a North American species of flowering shrub in the family Asteraceae known by the common name turpentine bush, or turpentine-brush. It is native to the southwestern United States (Arizona, New Mexico, western Texas, southwestern Utah, southern Nevada, southeastern California) and northern Mexico (Chihuahua).

Ericameria laricifolia grows in desert scrub and woodlands. It is a shrub reaching 50–100 cm (20-40 inches) in height, is generally hairless, somewhat glandular, and aromatic. It sometimes has naked stems at the base but the upper branches are densely foliated in needlelike, pointed leaves one to three centimeters (0.4-1.2 inches) long. The many erect branches bear inflorescences of bright golden yellow flower heads, each with up to 16 long disc florets and as many as 6 ray florets.

References

External links
Jepson Manual Treatment
United States Department of Agriculture Plants Profile
Calphotos Photo gallery, University of California
Photo of herbarium specimen at Missouri Botanical Garden, collected in New Mexico in 1851, isotype of Aplopappus laricifolius/Haplopappus laricifolius/Ericameria laricifolia

laricifolia
Flora of the Southwestern United States
Flora of Chihuahua (state)
Flora of the California desert regions
Natural history of the Mojave Desert
Plants described in 1853
Taxa named by Asa Gray